Jeff Williams (born February 11, 1976) is a Canadian former professional ice hockey player. He was selected by the New Jersey Devils in the seventh round (181st overall) of the 1994 NHL Entry Draft.

Over the course of his 10-year professional career, Williams played 334 regular-season games in the American Hockey League, as well as games in the Finnish SM-liiga and Swedish Elitserien.

Awards and honours

Career statistics

References

External links

1976 births
Living people
Albany River Rats players
Anglophone Quebec people
Ayr Scottish Eagles players
Brynäs IF players
Canadian ice hockey left wingers
Guelph Storm players
HC Merano players
Ice hockey people from Quebec
New Jersey Devils draft picks
Orlando Solar Bears (IHL) players
People from Pointe-Claire
Portland Pirates players
Quad City Mallards (UHL) players
Raleigh IceCaps players
Tallahassee Tiger Sharks players
Tappara players
Victoria Salmon Kings players
Wheeling Nailers players
Canadian expatriate ice hockey players in Scotland
Canadian expatriate ice hockey players in Italy
Canadian expatriate ice hockey players in Finland
Canadian expatriate ice hockey players in Sweden
Canadian expatriate ice hockey players in the United States